North Tacoma (also called the North End) is a neighborhood in Tacoma, Washington, in the United States. The area is most known for waterfront parks and restaurants, Point Defiance Park, the University of Puget Sound, Stadium High School, and the Tacoma Narrows Bridge.

Background 
The North End of Tacoma has informal and formal boundaries. Informally, the generally accepted boundaries of the North End are 6th Avenue and Division Avenue to the south and Puget Sound to the north, west, and east. Although the independent city of Ruston is not legally a part of the city of Tacoma, most residents of Ruston self-identify as being from Tacoma. 
Formally, the city has designations for each of the eight neighborhoods which are represented by neighborhood councils. These designations are not generally known, but they are marked on city streets by special signs. For the North End, 6th Ave forms the boundary on the south and southeast to 4th St., Puget Sound which runs NE to North, 46th St. on the North to Huson, and back down to 6th on the South. While much of the West End and some the Central District (such as the Stadium District) are identified with the informal boundaries of the North End, the City of Tacoma identifies these area as separate for purposes of representation and planning. 

The main commercial areas are along Sixth Ave and in the Proctor District and Old Town. The Sixth Ave corridor, Old Town and the Proctor District, have a variety of independent restaurants and shops. 

Although the area has a traditional heritage of lower middle class residents such as fisherman and ASARCO plant workers (before it was demolished in 1993), the community has a small-town feel. Most north end residents still work in Tacoma as evidenced by commute time figures from the 2000 Census. 

The waterfront, specifically around Old Tacoma has undergone redevelopment in recent years.

North Tacoma votes heavily Democratic on federal, state, and local areas, with all precincts giving sizable victories to John Kerry in the 2004 Presidential election, Barack Obama in 2008, and U.S. Senator Patty Murray in 2010.

Neighborhoods
Buckley Addition
College Park National Historic District
North Slope
Old Tacoma
Proctor District
Prospect Hill
Ruston (independent town)
Ruston Way
Skyline
Stadium District
Yakima Hill

Parks
Baltimore Park
Commencement Park
Cummings Park
Dickman Mill Park
Garfield Park
Hamilton Park
Jack Hyde Park
Jane Clark Playfield
Jefferson Park
Kandle Park
Les Davis Pier/Marine Park
North Slope Historic Park
Old Town Dock
Old Town Park
Optimist Park
Point Defiance Park
Proctor Community Garden
Puget Gardens Park
Puget Park
Ruston Way Park
Titlow Park
Ursich Gulch
Vassault Playfield
War Memorial Park

Education

Public elementary schools
Downing Elementary School
Grant Elementary School
Jefferson Elementary School
Lowell Elementary School
Point Defiance Elementary School
Sherman Elementary School
Skyline Elementary School
Washington-Hoyt Elementary School

Public middle schools
Jason Lee Middle School
Mason Middle School
Truman Middle School

Public high schools
Silas High School
Stadium High School

Private schools
Annie Wright School
Saint Patrick Catholic School

Universities
University of Puget Sound

Other landmarks
Blue Mouse Theatre
Commencement Bay
Cushman Substation & Towers
Engine House No. 9
Fire Station 13
Fort Nisqually
Old Woman's Gulch
Point Defiance Zoo & Aquarium
Puget Creek
Tacoma Narrows Bridge
Washington School
College Park National Historic District
North Tacoma, Washington
Neighborhoods in Tacoma, Washington